Coleophora coronata is a moth of the family Coleophoridae.

References

coronata
Moths described in 1994